The 2008 Supersport World Championship was the tenth FIM Supersport World Championship season—the twelfth taking into account the two held under the name of Supersport World Series. The season started on 23 February at Losail and finished on 2 November at Portimão after 13 rounds. The championship supported the Superbike World Championship at every round with the exception of Salt Lake City.

The season was marred by the death of Craig Jones as a result of injuries sustained in an accident at the Brands Hatch round.

Race calendar and results

Championship standings

Riders' standings

Manufacturers' standings

Entry list

 All entries used Pirelli tyres.

References

Supersport
Supersport World Championship seasons
World